On the Shoulders of Giants: The Great Works of Physics and Astronomy is a compilation of scientific texts edited and with commentary by the British theoretical physicist Stephen Hawking. The book was published by Running Press in 2002.

Content
The book includes selections from the following works in English:
On the Revolutions of the Heavenly Spheres by Nicolaus Copernicus, which explains Copernicus' theory of heliocentrism: that the Sun, rather than Earth, lies in the center of the universe
Two New Sciences by Galileo Galilei explains Galileo's discoveries in physics
Mystery of the Cosmos, Harmony of the World and Rudolphine Tables by Johannes Kepler, which describes Kepler's theories and observations in astronomy
Philosophiæ Naturalis Principia Mathematica (Mathematical Principles of Natural Philosophy) by Sir Isaac Newton
The Principle of Relativity by Albert Einstein

The book also includes five critical essays by Hawking and Hawking's biographies of the five scientists whose works are included.

References

2002 non-fiction books
Books by Stephen Hawking
Running Press books